Paul Weier (born 3 December 1934) is a Swiss former equestrian. He competed at the 1960, 1964, 1968 and the 1972 Summer Olympics.

References

External links
 

1934 births
Living people
Swiss male equestrians
Olympic equestrians of Switzerland
Equestrians at the 1960 Summer Olympics
Equestrians at the 1964 Summer Olympics
Equestrians at the 1968 Summer Olympics
Equestrians at the 1972 Summer Olympics
People from Winterthur District
Sportspeople from the canton of Zürich
20th-century Swiss people